Héctor López (born 13 September 1952) is a Venezuelan middle-distance runner. He competed in the men's 800 metres at the 1972 Summer Olympics.

References

External links
 

1952 births
Living people
Athletes (track and field) at the 1972 Summer Olympics
Venezuelan male middle-distance runners
Olympic athletes of Venezuela
Place of birth missing (living people)
Central American and Caribbean Games medalists in athletics
20th-century Venezuelan people
21st-century Venezuelan people